Arantxa Rus was the defending champion but lost to Nadia Podoroska in the quarterfinals.

Julia Grabher won the title, defeating Podoroska in the final, 6–4, 6–3.

Seeds
All seeds receive a bye into the second round.

Draw

Finals

Top half

Section 1

Section 2

Bottom half

Section 3

Section 4

References

External links
Main draw

ITF World Tennis Tour Maspalomas - Singles